The San Pedro Sun is a newspaper published continuously since 1991 and serves the community of San Pedro Town located on Ambergris Caye in Belize, Central America. The editors are Ron and Tamara Sniffin, assisted by Mary Gonzalez, Dennis and Natalie Manuel. The Sun also publishes a "Visitor's Guide" each week that features tourism interests in San Pedro and Belize. The Visitor Guide is inserted inside each issue of The San Pedro Sun.

External links
 
 

Publications established in 1991
Weekly newspapers published in Belize
1991 establishments in Belize